Judith Joy Davies (5 June 1928 – 27 March 2016) was an Australian former backstroke swimmer of the 1940s and 1950s, who won a bronze medal in the 100-metre backstroke at the 1948 Summer Olympics in London. At the national level, she won 17 Australian championships in freestyle, backstroke and medley swimming. She was well known after her swimming career as a long-time sporting journalist for the Melbourne newspapers The Argus and The Sun-News Pictorial.

The Second World War did not interrupt her competitive swimming career.

At international level, Davies concentrated on the backstroke, winning seven consecutive national titles from 1946 to 1952. She also won the 100-yard freestyle in 1947 and the 880-yard freestyle the following year. At the 1948 Olympics, Davies set an Olympic record in the heat of the 100m backstroke. However, in the final, she finished behind Denmark's Karen Harup and the United States' Suzanne Zimmerman.

Two years later at the 1950 British Empire Games in Auckland, Davies won three gold medals. She first won the 110-yard backstroke and then teamed up with Denise Spencer, Denise Norton and Marjorie McQuade to win the 4×110-yard freestyle relay. Finally, Davies with McQuade and Nancy Lyons won the 3×110-yard medley relay.

At the 1952 Summer Olympics in Helsinki, Davies switched to the 400-metre freestyle, but she disappointed, managing only ninth place.

Davies was inducted into the Sport Australia Hall of Fame in 2011.

See also

List of Australian Olympic medallists in swimming
 List of Olympic medalists in swimming (women)
 Women's swimming in Australia

References

Bibliography

 
 

1928 births
2016 deaths
Australian female backstroke swimmers
Australian female freestyle swimmers
Australian female medley swimmers
Olympic swimmers of Australia
Swimmers at the 1948 Summer Olympics
Swimmers at the 1952 Summer Olympics
Swimmers at the 1950 British Empire Games
Olympic bronze medalists in swimming
Olympic bronze medalists for Australia
Commonwealth Games gold medallists for Australia
Journalists from Melbourne
Sport Australia Hall of Fame inductees
Australian sports journalists
Medalists at the 1948 Summer Olympics
Commonwealth Games medallists in swimming
The Argus (Melbourne) people
Swimmers from Melbourne
People educated at Firbank Girls' Grammar School
20th-century Australian women
Medallists at the 1950 British Empire Games